Ibrahim Cissé (born 11 January 1999) is an Ivorian professional footballer who plays as a centre-back for KuPS.

Career
On 2 July 2018, joined the academy of OGC Nice. He made his professional debut with Nice in a 2–1 Ligue 1 win over Nîmes on 17 August 2019. After an unsuccessful loan spell at Portuguese club F.C. Famalicão, Cissé joined Ligue 2 club LB Châteauroux on loan on 3 July 2020 for the 2020–21 season. On 18 June 2021, he moved on a new loan to Championnat National club Le Mans.

References

External links
 
 

1999 births
Living people
People from Zanzan District
Ivorian footballers
Association football defenders
Ligue 1 players
Ligue 2 players
Championnat National players
Championnat National 3 players
Primeira Liga players
OGC Nice players
F.C. Famalicão players
LB Châteauroux players
Le Mans FC players
AS Nancy Lorraine players
Ivorian expatriate footballers
Ivorian expatriate sportspeople in France
Ivorian expatriate sportspeople in Portugal
Expatriate footballers in France
Expatriate footballers in Portugal